Hirth is a surname. Notable people with this surname include:

Friedrich Hirth Ph.D. (1845–1927), German-American sinologist
Georg Hirth (1841–1916), German writer, journalist and publisher
Hellmuth Hirth (1886–1938), German engineer who founded the Mahle GmbH and Hirth companies
John Joseph Hirth (1854–1931), Catholic Bishop in German East Africa
Wolf Hirth (1900–1959), German gliding pioneer and sailplane designer

See also
Hirth, aircraft engine manufacturer based in Benningen, Germany
Hirthia, a genus of tropical freshwater snails
Ghirth, a Hindu agricultural caste in Himachal Pradesh, North India

Surnames of German origin